Amblyodon dealbatus, short-tooth hump-moss, is a species of mosses belonging to the family Meesiaceae.

It is native to Europe and Northern America.

References

Splachnales